Žarko Tomašević (Serbian Cyrillic: Жapкo Toмaшeвић, ; born 22 February 1990) is a Montenegrin footballer who plays as a central defender for Kazakhstan Premier League club FC Astana and the Montenegro national team.

Club career
Born in Pljevlja, SR Montenegro, SFR Yugoslavia, Tomašević arrived in Portugal with CD Nacional aged 18. In 2009, he was called up to the first team by Manuel Machado, making his first division debut in a 1–1 home draw against Sporting CP, on 15 August 2009, and also totalled 17 minutes combined in the Madeiran club's historical UEFA Europa League 5–4 aggregate win against Zenit Saint Petersburg.

After very little playing time during the first half of the 2011–12 season, Tomašević was loaned to C.F. União in the second level, until June, reuniting with former Nacional coach Predrag Jokanović.

In summer 2012 he was released by Nacional, and at 14 September he was announced as a new reinforcement of FK Partizan. This will be his return to Serbia with Partizan, as he already spent some time as a youngster in the youth team of the club.

On 3 August 2019, FC Astana announced the signing of Tomašević on a free transfer.

After leaving Astana at the end of the 2021 season, Tomašević went on to sign a one-year contract with Tobol on 27 January 2022. On 15 January 2023, Tobol announced that they had terminated their contract with Tomašević by mutual consent, with Tomašević re-signing for Astana the same day.

International career
In late August 2009, Tomašević was first called to the Montenegro under-21 squad, for a 2011 European Championship qualifier against Sweden, in which his country lost 2–0 at home.

In May 2010, aged 20, he made his full international debut against Norway. In 2014, he scored his first international goal for Montenegro against Moldova in a 2016 European Championship qualification match.

Career statistics

Club

International

International goals
Scores and results list Montenegro's goal tally first.

References

External links

Žarko Tomašević at fscg.co.me

1990 births
Living people
Sportspeople from Pljevlja
Association football central defenders
Montenegrin footballers
Montenegro under-21 international footballers
Montenegro international footballers
C.D. Nacional players
C.F. União players
FK Partizan players
K.V. Kortrijk players
K.V. Oostende players
FC Astana players
Primeira Liga players
Belgian Pro League players
Kazakhstan Premier League players
Montenegrin expatriate footballers
Expatriate footballers in Belgium
Montenegrin expatriate sportspeople in Belgium
Expatriate footballers in Portugal
Montenegrin expatriate sportspeople in Portugal
Expatriate footballers in Kazakhstan
Montenegrin expatriate sportspeople in Kazakhstan